The LG MG810 (a.k.a. The LG Black Zafiro) is a mobile phone manufactured by LG Electronics. This phone is the GSM version of the phone commonly known as the Chocolate Flip. This clam shell style phone has touch sensitive music controls on the top, similar to the keypad used for navigation in the LG Chocolate series.

External links 
 Feature listing of the Black Zafiro

KE970

pt:LG Black Zafiro (MG810)